The FCT College of Education is a federal government higher education institution located in Zuba, Federal Capital Territory, Nigeria. It is affiliated to Ahmadu Bello University for its degree programmes. The current Provost is Mohammed Gambo Hamza.

History 
The FCT College of Education was established in 1996. It was formerly known as Teachers College, Zuba.

Courses 
The institution offers the following courses;

 Biology Education
 Christian Religious Studies
 Hausa
 Agricultural Science
 Economics
 Education and Mathematics
 Education and Geography
 Education and Arabic
 Islamic Studies
 Mathematics/Physics
 Social Studies
 Integrated Science
 Business Education
 English
 Computer Education
 Chemistry Education
 Geography
 Home Economics and Education
 Education and Social Studies
 Fine And Applied Arts
 Early Childhood and Care Education
 Physical And Health Education
 Igbo
 French
 Human Kinetics and Health Education
 Education and Islamic Studies

References 

Universities and colleges in Nigeria
1996 establishments in Nigeria